Kississing Lake is a lake in western Manitoba, Canada approximately 30 kilometres northeast of Flin Flon. The Kississing River drains it northeast into Flatrock Lake on the Churchill River. The 1,705 yard Kississing Portage connected the Churchill with the Burntwood River.

Lakes of Manitoba